Lê Sáng (1920 – September 27, 2010) was the Chairman of the Vovinam Vietnamese Martial Arts World Federation, a position he held from 1960 until his death.

Biography
Le Sang was born to Le Van Hien (also known as Duc Quang) (1887–1959) and Nguyen Thi Mui (1887–1993).  He was sickly as a child, which made it difficult for him to walk. His mother advised him to study martial arts in order to strengthen his legs.

In Hanoi he learned Vovinam at Nguyễn Lộc's Vovinam school. Soon Le Sang was a teacher himself and, together with Nguyễn Lộc, continued to develop Vovinam.

In 1954, Le Sang accompanied Nguyễn Lộc to Saigon to open a Vovinam school. He opened additional Vovinam schools, and as of 2007, was still teaching the higher-ranked students.

In 1960, Nguyễn Lộc passed the leadership of Vovinam to Le Sang.

After the fall of Saigon he spent several periods in prison. Leadership passed to Trần Huy Phong (1938-1997).

See also
 Vovinam
 Nguyễn Lộc
Nguyễn Văn Chiếu

References

External links
 Vo su Sang To Nguyen Loc
 Vovinam Toronto
 History of Vovinam in Switzerland ((German))

1920 births
2010 deaths
Vietnamese martial artists
Sportspeople from Hanoi